Emir Sinanović (born 24 October 1988) is a Bosnian–Swiss footballer, who currently plays for Rothrist.

Club career
After playing at the highest level in Switzerland with Aarau, he had two spells with Baden and played for FC Naters and Young Fellows Juventus.

Sinanović also played for lower league sides Muri and Schötz and he joined Rothrist in summer 2020.

References

External links
FC Aarau profile 

Swiss Football League profile

1988 births
Living people
People from Brčko District
Swiss people of Bosnia and Herzegovina descent
Association football midfielders
Bosnia and Herzegovina footballers
Swiss men's footballers
FC Aarau players
FC Wangen bei Olten players
FC Baden players
FC Naters players
SC Young Fellows Juventus players
Swiss Super League players
Swiss Challenge League players